JAMA Neurology is a monthly peer-reviewed medical journal published by the American Medical Association. It was established in 1960 as Archives of Neurology and obtained its current name in 2013. The journal publishes research on the nervous system as well as the various mechanisms of neurological disease. The editor-in-chief is S. Andrew Josephson.

Naming History

Abstracting and indexing 
The journal is abstracted and indexed in Index Medicus/MEDLINE/PubMed. According to Journal Citation Reports, the journal's 2021 impact factor is 29.907, ranking it 3rd out of 212 titles in the category "Clinical Neurology".

See also
List of American Medical Association journals

References

External links

Neurology journals
Publications established in 1960
Monthly journals
English-language journals
American Medical Association academic journals